Wilfred Brown may refer to:
 Wilfred Brown (tenor) (1921–1971), English tenor
 Wilfred Brown, Baron Brown (1908–1985), British businessman and politician
 Wilfred Brown (cricketer) (1930–2015), Australian cricketer
 Wilfred George Brown (1906–1970), commissioner of Yukon